Burel Valley is a Sub-Balkan Valley in western Bulgaria.

The valley is limited by the western branches of Chepan Mountain (part of the Balkan Mountains) to the north, Zavalska Mountain and Viskyar to the south and Greben Mountain (in Serbia) to the west. To the east, via the watershed between the rivers Slivnitsa and Gaberska and Aldomirovtsi altitudes, the Burel Valley is connected with the Sofia valley. It covers an area of 172 km2 and its length from the northwest to the southeast is about 15 km and its width is 7 – 10 km. Its average altitude is 765 m.

References 

 Дрончилов, Крум. „Бурел. Антропогеографски изучвания“, София, 1923 г., 250 стр.

Valleys of Bulgaria